George Sterling (December 1, 1869 – November 17, 1926) was an American writer based in the San Francisco, California Bay Area and Carmel-by-the-Sea. He was considered a prominent poet and playwright and proponent of Bohemianism during the first quarter of the twentieth century. His work was admired by writers as diverse as Ambrose Bierce, Robinson Jeffers, Jack London, Upton Sinclair, Theodore Dreiser, Sinclair Lewis, and Clark Ashton Smith.

Life and career
Sterling was born in Sag Harbor, New York, the eldest of nine children.  His father was Dr. George A. Sterling, a physician who determined to make a priest of one of his sons, and George was selected to attend, for three years, St. Charles College in Maryland. He was instructed in English by poet John B. Tabb.  His mother Mary was a member of the Havens family, prominent in Sag Harbor and the Shelter Island area.  Her brother, Frank C. Havens, Sterling's uncle, went to San Francisco in the late 19th century and established himself as a prominent lawyer and real estate developer.  Sterling eventually followed him to the West in 1890 and worked as a real estate broker in Oakland, California.  With the publication of his small volume of poetry in 1903, The Testimony of the Sun and Other Poems, he quickly became a hero among the East Bay literati and artists, some of whom included Joaquin Miller, Jack London, Xavier Martinez, Harry Leon Wilson, Perry H. Newberry, Henry Lafler, Gelett Burgess, and James Hopper.

In 1905 Sterling moved 120 miles south to Carmel-by-the-Sea, California, an undeveloped coastal paradise, and soon established a settlement for like-minded Bohemian writers and other children of the counterculture. His aunt, Mrs. Havens, purchased a home for him in Carmel Woods where he lived for six years. Artist Charles Rollo Peters and Robinson Jeffers were influential in Sterling's move to Carmel. A parallel colony of painters was also developing in this enclave.  Carmel had been discovered by Charles Warren Stoddard and others, but Sterling made it world-famous. In addition to the Bay Area residents mentioned above, Sterling managed to attract, as either visitors or semi-permanent residents, the satirical iconoclast Ambrose Bierce, novelist Mary Austin, art photographer Arnold Genthe, and writer Clark Ashton Smith.  When a firestorm of controversy followed Sterling's publication of A Wine of Wizardry in the Cosmopolitan magazine of September 1907, other rebels flocked to Carmel, including Upton Sinclair and the MacGowan sisters. The death by poison of the young poet Nora May French in Sterling's home drew national press coverage. The suicide of Sterling's wife by cyanide only added fuel to the flames.. Sterling's own diaries and correspondence reveal a more sedate, but still Bohemian community.  He often volunteered at Carmel's Forest Theatre and once played a starring role in Mary Austin's play The Fire.  He is depicted twice in Jack London's novels: as Russ Brissenden in the autobiographical Martin Eden (1909) and as Mark Hall in The Valley of the Moon (1913).

Kevin Starr (1973) wrote:

The uncrowned King of Bohemia (so his friends called him), Sterling had been at the center of every artistic circle in the San Francisco Bay Area. Celebrated as the embodiment of the local artistic scene, though forgotten today, Sterling had in his lifetime been linked with the immortals, his name carved on the walls of the Panama–Pacific International Exposition next to the great poets of the past.

Joseph Noel (1940) says that Sterling's poem, A Wine of Wizardry, has "been classed by many authorities as the greatest poem ever written by an American author."

According to Noel, Sterling sent the final draft of A Wine of Wizardry to the normally acerbic and critical Ambrose Bierce. Bierce said "If I could find a flaw in it, I should quickly call your attention to it... It takes the breath away."

Sterling joined the Bohemian Club and acted in their theatrical productions each summer at the Bohemian Grove. For the main Grove play in 1907, the club presented The Triumph of Bohemia, Sterling's verse drama depicting the battle between the "Spirit of Bohemia" and Mammon for the souls of the grove's woodmen. Sterling also supplied lyric for the musical numbers at the 1918 Grove play.

Bierce, who acclaimed Sterling's poem The Testimony of the Suns, in his "Prattle" column in William Randolph Hearst's San Francisco Examiner, arranged for the publication of A Wine of Wizardry in the September 1907 number of Cosmopolitan, which afforded Sterling some national notice. In an introduction to the poem, Bierce wrote "Whatever length of days may be according to this magazine, it is not likely to do anything more notable in literature than it accomplished in this issue by the publication of Mr. George Sterling's poem, 'A Wine of Wizardry.'" Bierce wrote to Sterling, "I hardly know how to speak of it. No poem in English of equal length has so bewildering a wealth of imagination. Not Spencer himself has flung such a profusion of jewels into so small a casket".

Sterling fell into drinking and his wife departed. Noel, a personal acquaintance, says that when he began the poem, Sterling "was persuaded that there was another world than that we know. He repeated this to me so frequently that it became a trifle tiresome. Of the means he employed to get a glimpse of that other world, I am not so sure." He observes that "many before Sterling had used narcotics to this end;" that "George, a doctor's son, had always had access to whatever drugs he fancied;" says that Sterling's wife said "that George had purloined a great quantity of opium from his brother Wickham," and speaks of "internal evidence in the poem" in which "Sterling writes his Fancy awakened with a 'brow caressed by poppybloom.'" Despite all this, Noel makes a point of saying "there is no direct evidence that Sterling used narcotics."

Sterling also wrote for children The Saga of the Pony Express.

Despite such famous mentors as Bierce and Ina Coolbrith, and his long association with London, Sterling himself never became well known outside California.

Sterling's poetry is both visionary and mystical, but he also wrote ribald quatrains that were often unprintable and left unpublished.   His style reflects the Romantic charm of such poets as Shelley, Keats and Poe, and he provided guidance and encouragement to the similarly inclined Clark Ashton Smith at the beginning of Smith's own career.

Sterling carried a vial of cyanide for many years. When asked about it he said, "A prison becomes a home if you have the key". Finally in November 1926, Sterling used it at his residence at the San Francisco Bohemian Club after not receiving an expected visit from H. L. Mencken. Kevin Starr wrote that "When George Sterling's corpse was discovered in his room at the Bohemian Club... the golden age of San Francisco's bohemia had definitely come to a miserable end."

Sterling's most famous line was delivered to the city of San Francisco, "the cool, grey city of love!".

Memorials
 During World War II, the Liberty ship SS George Sterling (MC hull no. 2152) was launched September 19, 1943.
 In 2002, artist Robert Alexander Baillie carved George Sterling's poem “Pumas” onto a large limestone monument in South Carolina’s Brookgreen Gardens.
 Sterling Avenue in Berkeley is named for George Sterling.
 Sterling Avenue in Alameda is named for George Sterling.
 Sterling Drive in Oakland is thought to be named for George Sterling.
 On October 8, 1950, in Joaquin Miller Park in Oakland, the California Writers Club dedicated a redwood tree near the park's cascade as a memorial to Sterling.
 In 1904, sculptor Robert Ingersoll Aitken carved a bas relief portrait of Sterling for display at the St. Louis World's Fair. This sculpture is on permanent display in the Harrison Memorial Library's Henry Meade Williams Local History Department in Carmel-by-the-Sea, California.
 A portrait bust of Sterling by sculptor Ralph Stackpole is displayed near the History Department in Dwinelle Hall at the University of California, Berkeley.
 In the Beach Chalet in San Francisco's Golden Gate Park, the 1937 ground floor mural by Lucien Labaudt includes a painted banner arched over a doorway with the quotation "At the end of our streets—the stars," from Sterling's poem "The City by The Sea: San Francisco," and Sterling's name and life dates "1869-1926."
 In San Francisco at the northeast corner of Townsend Street and Embarcadero is a stone monument with Sterling's name, the date 1901, and the quotation "To each the city of his dream."
 In 1922, a large bronze plaque was placed in front of the official residence for San Francisco's fire chief at 870 Bush Street with a quotation from Sterling.
 A stone bench was dedicated to Sterling on June 25, 1926, at the crest of Hyde Street on Russian Hill. The bench includes a plaque with a quotation from Sterling's poem "The Cool, Grey City of Love."  In 1982, the park where the bench is located was named "George Sterling Park".

Writings

Poetry
 The Testimony of the Suns and Other Poems (San Francisco: W. E. Wood, 1903; San Francisco: A. M. Robertson, 1904, 1907; St. Clair Shores, Michigan: Scholarly Press, 1970)
 A Wine of Wizardry and Other Poems (San Francisco: A. M. Robertson, 1909).
 The House of Orchids and Other Poems (San Francisco: A. M. Robertson, 1911).
 Beyond the Breakers and Other Poems (San Francisco: A. M. Robertson, 1914).
 Ode on the Opening of the Panama–Pacific International Exposition (San Francisco: A. M. Robertson, 1915).
 The Evanescent City (San Francisco: A. M. Robertson, 1915).
 The Caged Eagle and Other Poems (San Francisco: A. M. Robertson, 1916).
 Yosemite: An Ode (San Francisco: A. M. Robertson, 1916).
 The Binding of the Beast and Other War Verse (San Francisco: A. M. Robertson, 1917).
 Thirty-Five Sonnets (San Francisco: Book Club of California, 1917).
 To a Girl Dancing (San Francisco: Grabhorn, 1921).
 Sails and Mirage and Other Poems (San Francisco: A. M. Robertson, 1921).
 Selected Poems (New York: Henry Holt, 1923; San Francisco: A. M. Robertson, 1923); St. Clair Shores, Michigan: Scholarly Press, 1970).
 Strange Waters (San Francisco: Paul Elder [?], 1926).
 The Testimony of the Suns, Including Comments, Suggestions, and Annotations by Ambrose Bierce: A Facsmile of the Original Typewritten Manuscript (San Francisco: Book Club of California, 1927).
 Sonnets to Craig, Upton Sinclair, ed. (Long Beach, Calif.: Upton Sinclair, 1928; New York: Albert & Charles Boni, 1928).
 Five Poems ([San Francisco]: Windsor Press, 1928).
 Poems to Vera (New York: Oxford University Press, 1938).
 After Sunset, R. H. Barlow, ed. (San Francisco: John Howell, 1939).
 A Wine of Wizardry and Three Other Poems, Dale L. Walker, ed. (Fort Johnson: "a private press," 1964).
 George Sterling: A Centenary Memoir-Anthology, Charles Angoff, ed. (South Brunswick and New York: Poetry Society of America, 1969).
 The Thirst of Satan: Poems of Fantasy and Terror, S. T. Joshi, ed. (New York: Hippocampus Press, 2003).
 Complete Poetry, S. T. Joshi and David E. Schultz, eds. (New York: Hippocampus Press, 2013).
 El Testimonio de los Soles y Otres Poemas, Ariadna Garcia Carreño, ed. and translator (Madrid: Editorial Verbum, 2022)

Plays
 The Triumph of Bohemia: A Forest Play, music by Edward F. Schneider (San Francisco: Bohemian Club, 1907).
 A Masque of the Cities with Henry Anderson Lafler, music by several composers ([Oakland]: [Oakland Commercial Club], 1913).
 The Play of Everyman, based on the play by Hugo von Hofmannsthal, translated by Sterling and "Richard" Ryszard Ordynski, music by Victor Schertzinger (San Francisco: A. M. Robertson, 1917); music by Einar Nelson (Los Angeles: Primavera Press, 1939).
 The Twilight of the Kings with Richard Hotaling and [uncredited] Porter Garnett, music by Wallace Arthur Sabin (San Francisco: Bohemian Club, 1918).
 Lilith: A Dramatic Poem (San Francisco: A. M. Robertson, 1919; San Francisco: Book Club of California, 1920; New York: Macmillan, 1926).
 Rosamund: A Dramatic Poem (San Francisco: A. M. Robertson, 1920).
 Truth, music by Domenico Brescia (Chicago: Bookfellows, 1923; San Francisco: Bohemian Club, 1926).

Songs
 Songs, music by Lawrence Zenda (Rosaliene Travis, pseud.), (San Francisco: Sherman, Clay, 1916, 1918, 1928).
 "You Are So Beautiful", music by Lawrence Zenda (Rosaliene Travis, pseud.), (San Francisco: Sherman, Clay, 1917).
 "We're A-Going" (San Francisco: Sherman, Clay, 1918).
 "Love Song," music by John H. Densmore, (New York: G. Schirmer, 1926).
 "The Abalone Song," with additional verses by Opal Herron, Sinclair Lewis, Michael Williams, and others, (San Francisco: Albert M. Bender [Grabhorn Press], 1937; San Francisco: Windsor Press, 1943; Los Angeles: Tuscan Press, 1998).

Nonfiction
 Robinson Jeffers: The Man and the Artist (New York: Boni & Liveright, 1926).

Fiction
 Babes in the Wood (San Francisco: Vince Emery, 2020).

Letters
 Give a Man a Boat He Can Sail: Letters of George Sterling, James Henry, ed. (Detroit: Harlo, 1980).
 From Baltimore to Bohemia: The Letters of H. L. Mencken and George Sterling, ed. S. T. Joshi (Rutherford, NJ: Fairleigh Dickinson University, 2001).
 Dear Master: Letters of George Sterling to Ambrose Bierce, 1900–1912, Roger K. Larson, ed. (San Francisco: Book Club of California; 2002).
 The Shadow of the Unattained: The Letters of George Sterling and Clark Ashton Smith, David E. Schultz and S. T. Joshi, eds. (New York: Hippocampus Press, 2005).

Volumes edited by Sterling
 The Letters of Ambrose Bierce, uncredited editor with Bertha Clark Pope, (San Francisco: Book Club of California, 1922). Sterling was co-editor and wrote "A Memoir of Ambrose Bierce" for this volume.
 Continent's End: An Anthology of Contemporary California Poets, ed. with Genevieve Taggard and James Rorty (San Francisco: Book Club of California, 1925).

References
Notes

Bibliography
 Benediktsson, Thomas E. (1980).  George Sterling.  Boston: Twayne Publishers.  .
 Cusatis, John (2006).  "George Sterling."  Greenwood Encyclopedia of American Poets and poetry, Volume 5, Westport, CT: Greenwood Publishers, 1530–1531.
 Cusatis, John (2010) "Kindred Poets of Carmel: The Philosophical and Aesthetic Affinities of George Sterling and Robinson Jeffers" Jeffers Studies, Volume 13, Number 1 & 2, 1–11.
 Joshi, S. T. (2008).  "George Sterling: Prophet of the Suns," chapter 1 in Emperors of Dreams: Some Notes on Weird Poetry. Sydney: P'rea Press.
 Noel, Joseph (1940).  Footloose in Arcadia.  New York: Carrick and Evans.
 Parry, Albert (1933, first edition). "Lovely Chaos in Carmel and Taos", chapter 20 within Garretts & Pretenders: A History of Bohemianism in America, republished in 1960 and 2005, Cosimo, Inc. 
 Starr, Kevin (1973).  Americans and the California Dream 1850–1915.  Oxford University Press.  1986 reprint:

External links

George-Sterling.org Collected works, image gallery, bibliography and critical articles.
A George Sterling Page:  A brief biography of Sterling.
George Sterling, Poet:  A page by the poet's grand niece.
George Sterling (1869–1926):  A collection of Sterling's poems; notes on memorial glade in San Francisco.
George Sterling: Poet and Friend by Clark Ashton Smith
5 short radio episodes from Sterling's poems at California Legacy Project.
Guide to the Collection of George Sterling Papers at The Bancroft Library
 Finding aid to George Sterling papers, 1916-1943, at Columbia University. Rare Book & Manuscript Library.
Finding Aid to the Albert M. Bender collection of George Sterling papers circa 1880-1998 at San Francisco Public Library.

 
 
 

1869 births
1926 suicides
20th-century American dramatists and playwrights
20th-century American male writers
20th-century American poets
American male dramatists and playwrights
American male poets
History of the San Francisco Bay Area
People from Carmel-by-the-Sea, California
People from Sag Harbor, New York
Poets from California
Poets from New York (state)
Suicides by cyanide poisoning
Suicides in California
Writers from San Francisco